was a Japanese philosopher, best known for his work in the 
philosophy of religion dealing mostly with western religion and also western philosophical thoughts in theological aspects of Christianity.

Biography
Hatano was born in Matsumoto in Nagano Prefecture, and educated at Tokyo Imperial University, from which he graduated in 1899.  He was very influential in stimulating the study in Japan of Western philosophy and religion, both through his teaching (he was the first to teach the history of Western philosophy at Tokyo Semmon Gakko, now Waseda University), and through his early writings.  These included An Outline of the History of Western Philosophy (1897), The Origins of Christianity (1909), and A Study of Spinoza (1904–1905). The last of these was originally written in German and only translated into Japanese in 1910). It was reprinted after WW2.

He opposed a positivist approach to religion, arguing that though rationality underpinned religious beliefs, it depended upon an autonomous form of experience to discover at least partial truth.

He died in Tokyo at the age of seventy-three.

Bibliography
1897: An Outline of the History of Western Philosophy
1909: The Origins of Christianity
1904: A Study of Spinoza
1920: The Essence of the Philosophy of Religion and its Fundamental Problems
1935: Philosophy of Religion
1940: Introduction to the Philosophy of Religion
1943: Time and Eternity

References
St Elmo Hauman Jr. Dictionary of Asian Philosophies (London: Routledge, 1979) 
John Maraldo. "Contemporary Japanese Philosophy" (in Brian Carr & Indira Mahalingam [edd]. Companion Encyclopedia of Asian Philosophy (London: Routledge, 1997) 

Britannica bio

1877 births
1950 deaths
19th-century philosophers
20th-century Japanese philosophers
Philosophers of religion
University of Tokyo alumni
Academic staff of Kyoto University
Academic staff of the University of Tokyo
Kyoto School
People from Matsumoto, Nagano